iTunes Live: London Festival '09 may refer to:
 The 2009 iTunes Festival
 iTunes Live: London Festival '09 (Placebo album)
 iTunes Live: London Festival '09 (General Fiasco EP)
 iTunes Live: London Festival '09 (Kasabian EP)
 iTunes Live: London Festival '09 (Snow Patrol EP)
 iTunes Live: London Festival '09 (The Saturdays EP)
 iTunes Live: London Festival '09 (Franz Ferdinand EP)
 iTunes Live: London Festival '09 (Marina and the Diamonds EP)
 iTunes Live: London Festival '09 (The Temper Trap EP)
 iTunes Live: London Festival '09 (Sophie Ellis-Bextor EP)
 iTunes Live: London Festival '09 (La Roux EP)